James Howard Van Pelt (February 24, 1857September 19, 1915) was a 19th-century New York Sandy Hook Pilot. He is best known for being a Sandy Hook pilot for forty years. He lost his life while boarding a Standard Oil tanker outside Sandy Hook. His father, Howard Van Pelt, was also a Sandy Hook pilot and lost his life in a similar way.

Early life

James H. Van Pelt was born Stapleton, Staten Island, in 1857. His father was Howard Van Pelt and his mother was Margaret M. Perry. He was married to Petra Gertrude Jacobson on April 23, 1892. They had one child. 

Van Pelt was fifteen when he helped his father sail a four masted schooner safely into the Brooklyn docks. His father was knocked overboard when the hawser parted and struck him in the chest while towing the bark Ukraine.

Career

James H. Van Pelt was in the pilot service for forty years without a single accident. He received his pilots' license in 1888. 

On July 20, 1942, his cousin, Frank P. Van Pelt, a Sandy Hook Pilot, died at age 81 in Staten Island.

Death

On September 19, 1915, James H. Van Pelt, at age 58, died while boarding a Standard Oil tanker No. 95, outside Ambrose Light during rough weather. He was on the pilot boat Sandy Hook when he slipped from the ladder trying to board the barge and hit his head on the pilot boat's yawl. Funeral services were at his residence in Brooklyn and the next day at the St. Patrick's Church, Fort Hamilton. He was buried at the Green-wood Cemetery in Brooklyn.

Van Pelt was a member of the Elks and a member of the St. Patrick's Roman Catholic Church. His wife and daughter were still living at the time of his death.

See also

List of Northeastern U. S. Pilot Boats

References

 
 

Maritime pilotage
Sea captains
People from Brooklyn
1915 deaths
1857 births